Propaganda is the fourth studio album by American rock band Sparks, released on November 11, 1974. Following up their previous year's commercial breakthrough, Kimono My House, it was a moderate success in the United States and peaked at No. 9 in the U.K. in 1975. The album cover features an image of a tied-up and gagged Mael brothers, titled "Welcome on Board," which was taken by photographer Monty Coles.

Release
The album followed its predecessor Kimono My House by half a year and was a successful album in the UK and US. It peaked at No. 9 on the UK Album Chart(which would remain their second highest album chart position in the UK for nearly 43 years until pushed down into third place by Hippopotamus in 2017) and No. 63 on the Billboard 200 (and remains their highest peak in that country).

The singles "Never Turn Your Back on Mother Earth" and "Something for the Girl with Everything", while not as successful as those from Kimono My House both reached the Top 20 in the UK peaking at No. 13 and No. 17 respectively. In France, "At Home, at Work, at Play" together with "Propaganda" was released as a single instead of "Something for the Girl with Everything". In the US, "Achoo" was released as the album's only single.

"Bon Voyage" appears briefly in the 2021 musical drama film Annette, which Ron and Russell co-wrote the songs with the director Leos Carax.

Critical reception 
Reviewing in Christgau's Record Guide: Rock Albums of the Seventies (1981), Robert Christgau wrote: "Admirers of these self-made twerps certainly don't refer to them as pop because they get on the AM—for once the programmers are doing their job. So is it because they sing in a high register? Or because a good beat makes them even more uncomfortable than other accoutrements of a well-lived life?; 'Never turn your back on mother earth,' they chant or gibber in a style unnatural enough to end your current relationship or kill your cacti, and I must be a natural man after all, because I can't endure the contradiction."

Dave Connolly of AllMusic touched on the criticism: "The torrential outpouring of words and ideas, underscored by guitars and keyboards with oft-shifting rhythms, either repels or attracts listeners." However, he believed "close-minded" American listeners were more critical of the album's "cross between 10cc and the power pop of the late '70s", concluding that "Propaganda remains one of Sparks' brightest achievements, brimming with a loopy charm that continued to captivate the open-minded English listeners".

Re-release
Propaganda was re-issued and remastered by Island in 1994 and 2006. The first issue by the Island Masters subsidiary added the b-sides "Alabamy Right" and "Marry Me". The '21st Century Edition' also included an interview from Saturday Scene recorded in November 1974.

Track listing

 Sides one and two were combined as tracks 1–11 on CD reissues.

Charts

Personnel

Sparks
 Russell Mael — vocals
 Ron Mael — keyboards
 Trevor White — guitar
 Ian Hampton — bass
 Norman "Dinky" Diamond — drums
 Adrian Fisher — guitar

Production and artwork
 Produced by Muff Winwood
 Recording Engineers - Richard Digby-Smith, Robin Black and Bill Price
 Remix Engineer — Bill Price
 Concept and Photography — Monty Coles

References

External links
Sparks - The "Propaganda" album files
Something for the Girl with Everything, original era performance video
BC original era performance video including a mid-point surprise

Sparks (band) albums
1974 albums
Albums produced by Muff Winwood
Island Records albums